Anil K. Gupta (born September 24, 1949) is an American academic specializing in business strategy. He holds the Michael D. Dingman Chair in Strategy, Globalization, and Entrepreneurship at University of Maryland’s Robert H. Smith School of Business.

Gupta is the author of several books including The Quest for Global Dominance: Transforming Global Presence into Global Competitive Advantage, Global Strategy and Organization,   Getting China and India Right: Strategies for Leveraging the World's Fastest-Growing Economies for Global Advantage, and The Silk Road Rediscovered: How Indian and Chinese Companies Are Becoming Globally Stronger by Competing in Each Other's Markets.

Ranked by Thinkers50 as one of the world's most influential management thinkers, he has been named by The Economist as one of the world's "superstars" for research on emerging markets in a cover story. He is also the recipient of the 2017 Outstanding Educator Award from the Academy of Management's International Management Division for worldwide contribution to research, practice, and teaching on the topic of globalization.

Gupta is a Fellow of Academy of Management, Strategic Management Society, and Academy of International Business. He is an invited member of CNBC Disrupters 50 Advisory Council, The Bretton Woods Committee, and the World Economic Forum’s Stewardship Board for the System Initiative on the Future of Consumption.

Education
Gupta earned a Bachelor of Technology degree in mechanical engineering from the Indian Institute of Technology at Kanpur in 1970, a Master of Business Administration degree in marketing from the Indian Institute of Management at Ahmedabad in 1972, and a Doctor of Business Administration degree in business strategy from Harvard Business School.

Career
Before moving to the U.S., Gupta worked as an Area Sales Manager and a Product Manager at Hindustan Unilever from 1972 till 1975. From 1979-1986, he was an Assistant Professor of Management Policy at Boston University’s School of Management. In 1986, he joined Robert H. Smith School of Business at the University of Maryland. Gupta was promoted to Professor in 1992, designated as the Ralph J. Tyser Professor in 2001, and as the Michael D. Dingman Chair in 2009.

Gupta has served as an elected board member for several companies including Origene Technologies, Omega Worldwide, Vitalink, and NeoMagic. He has also served on the advisory boards of the Entrepreneurship Centre at IIT Bombay, Asia Silicon Valley Connection, and as an advisor to the US-India Business Council.

Research
Gupta’s research has focused on three areas: strategy, globalization, and entrepreneurship. He is the author of several books as well as over 80 papers.

Gupta co-authored a paper regarding knowledge flows within multinational corporations, and presented the results of an empirical study on the factors that foster or constrain the sharing of know-how within the multinational enterprise. The study examined the role of five factors: the stock of knowledge within a potential sender, the incentive structure in which the sender operates, the fidelity of communication channels, the incentive structure of the potential receiver, and the knowledge stock of the potential receiver.  As of December 17, 2020, the paper had a citation count of 5260 on Google Scholar. An article by Klaus E. Meyer in Journal of International Business Studies ranked it as the #1 most cited paper in the research literature on the subject of “Managing the MNE Subsidiary.”

Gupta also focused on knowledge flows and the structure of control within multinational corporations and presented a theoretical framework that lays out the optimal corporate control structure for subsidiaries playing different roles in the global knowledge network of the multinational enterprise. Gupta and his fellow researchers conceptualized the differences in subsidiary roles to be a function of two factors: the extent to which the subsidiary is a user of knowledge from the rest of the corporation, and the extent to which the subsidiary is a provider of such knowledge to the rest of the corporation. An article by Klaus E. Meyer in Journal of International Business Studies ranked it as the #4 most cited paper in the research literature on the subject of “Managing the MNE Subsidiary.”

In 2000, Gupta, along with Vijay Govindarajan, authored a paper titled "Knowledge Management's Social Dimension: Lessons From Nucor Steel," and presented an analysis of how the social ecosystem of an organization affects the creation, diffusion, and use of know-how within the enterprise. They conducted the analysis by examining the case of Nucor Corporation, a U.S.-based company that has been one of the most efficient steel manufacturers in the world for several decades.

In an article titled, "Knowledge spillovers and the assignment of R&D responsibilities to foreign subsidiaries," Susan Feinberg and Gupta used a large‐scale panel database of the foreign subsidiaries of U.S.‐based MNCs in above‐average R&D‐intensive industries to examine the extent to which external spillover opportunities as well as internal firm‐specific capabilities to utilize such knowledge affect MNCs' new R&D location decisions. Their findings suggested that MNCs appear to anticipate potential spillover opportunities and are discriminating in assessing these opportunities not only across locations but also across categories of competitors within the same location.

Gupta conducted research on the interplay between exploration and exploitation and started his study from the premise that exploration and exploitation have emerged as the twin concepts underpinning organizational adaptation research. His study addressed four questions: What do exploration and exploitation mean? Are they two ends of a continuum or orthogonal to each other? How should organizations achieve a balance between exploration and exploitation—via ambidexterity or punctuated equilibrium? Finally, must all organizations strive for a balance, or is specialization in exploitation or exploration sometimes sufficient for long-run success?

In Business Unit Strategy, Managerial Characteristics, and Business Unit Effectiveness at Strategy Implementation, Gupta and his co-authors presented the results of an empirical study into the question of whether or not a fit between the personality characteristics (risk propensity and tolerance for ambiguity) of a business unit general manager and the business unit's strategy (build vs. harvest) actually results in superior performance. They found the answer to be in the affirmative. This paper was included in the list of The Ten Most Often Cited Articles Published in AMJ, 1958-95 by former editor Richard T. Mowday in a paper titled "Celebrating 40 Years of the Academy of Management Journal".

Awards and honors
1984 - Broderick Prize for Excellence in Research, Boston University.
1994 - Ranked as one of the "Top 20 North American Superstars" for research in strategy and organization, Management International Review.
1998 - Allen J. Krowe Award for Excellence in Teaching, Robert H. Smith School of Business, University of Maryland at College Park. 
1997-1998 - Distinguished Scholar-Teacher Award, University of Maryland 
2000 - Included in the Academy of Management Journals’ Hall of Fame
2004-2006 - Guest Editor, Academy of Management Journal special issue on “Managing Exploration and Exploitation” (co-editors: Ken Smith and Chris Shalley).
2005-2007 - Guest Editor, Organization Science special issue on “Innovation Research At and Across Levels” (co-editors: Susan Taylor and Paul Tesluk).
2006-2008 - Guest Editor, Information Systems Research special issue on “The Interplay Between Digital and Social Networks” (co-editors: Ritu Agarwal and Robert Kraut).
2010 - Elected life-time Fellow, Academy of International Business
2010 - Axiom Book Awards’ Silver Prize for Best Book in Globalization/International Business for Getting China and India Right
July 2010 - Best Professor in Strategy Award from CMO Asia.
2010 - Elected life-time Fellow, Strategic Management Society
2012 - Elected life-time Fellow, Academy of Management
2013, 2015, 2017, 2019 - Included in Thinkers 50’s biannual list of the world’s 50 most influential management thinkers
2017-18 - Distinguished Teaching Award, Smith School of Business, the University of Maryland
2017 - Outstanding Educator Award, Academy of Management

Bibliography

Books
The Quest for Global Dominance: Transforming Global Presence into Global Competitive Advantage (2001) 
Smart Globalization: Designing Global Strategies, Creating Global Networks (2003) 
Global Strategy and Organization (2004) 
The Quest for Global Dominance: Transforming Global Presence into Global Competitive Advantage, 2nd Edition (2008) 
Getting China and India Right: Strategies for Leveraging the World’s Fastest-Growing Economies for Global Advantage (2009) 
Global Strategies for Emerging Asia. (2012) 
The Silk Road Rediscovered: How Indian and Chinese Companies Are Becoming Globally Stronger by Competing in Each Other's Markets (2014)

Selected articles
Gupta, A.K., & Govindarajan, V. 1984. Business unit strategy, managerial characteristics, and business unit effectiveness at strategy implementation. Academy of Management Journal, 27 (1): 25-41.
Gupta, A.K., & Govindarajan, V. 1991. Knowledge flows and the structure of control within multinational firms. Academy of Management Review, 16: 768-792.
Gupta, A.K., & Govindarajan, V. 2000. Knowledge management’s social dimension: Lessons from Nucor Steel. Sloan Management Review. Fall: 71-80. 
Gupta, A.K., & Govindarajan, V. 2000. Knowledge flows within multinational corporations. Strategic Management Journal. 21: 473-496.
Feinberg, S.E., Gupta, A.K. 2004. Knowledge spillovers and the assignment of R&D responsibilities to foreign subsidiaries. Strategic Management Journal. 25: 823-845.
Gupta, A.K., Smith, K.G., & Shalley, C. 2006. The interplay between exploration and exploitation. Academy of Management Journal. 49: 693-706.
Zhang, L., Gupta, A.K., & Hallen, B. 2017. The Conditional Importance of Prior Ties: A Group-Level Analysis of Venture Capital Syndication. Academy of Management Journal. 60(4): 1360-1386.

References 

American people of Indian descent
Living people
1949 births
Indian Institute of Management Ahmedabad alumni
IIT Kanpur alumni
Harvard Business School alumni
University System of Maryland faculty